Kuznetsovo is a rural locality (a selo) and the administrative center of Kuznetsovsky Selsoviet, Kuryinsky District, Altai Krai, Russia. The population was 577 as of 2013. There are 7 streets.

Geography 
Kuznetsovo is located 28 km northwest of Kurya (the district's administrative centre) by road. Krasnoznamenka is the nearest rural locality.

References 

Rural localities in Kuryinsky District